Bernhard Schneyer (born 26 February 1968) is a German composer, conductor and music educator.

Life 
Schneyer was born in Wernigerode. Music has played an important role in his life since he was five years old. So from the age of six he received violin lessons at the music school in Wernigerode and later played in the orchestra of the music school. Later he also received additional piano lessons. From the age of 15 he continued his musical education in the special classes for music (today ) in the same subjects as well as composition. At the same time he sang in the radio youth choir of Wernigerode. The active violin playing receded more and more into the background, but it has been preserved to this day in some points. He finished his school education in 1986 with the Abitur and the choirmaster qualification. Afterwards he completed his military service.

From 1988 to 1994 Schneyer studied at the Hochschule für Musik Carl Maria von Weber in the main subjects composition with Jörg Herchet and violin with Christian Redder. During his studies he changed his main subject from violin to piano with Gunnar Nauck. He finished his studies with a diploma and an artistic examination. 

From 1994 to 1995 he was also a teacher of music theory and composition, leader of the music school orchestra and a studio for electronic sound production at the Bernburg Music School. From 2001 Schneyer taught hearing training and composition at the Institute of Music of the Otto von Guericke University Magdeburg until its closure in 2010, and since 2008 he has also conducted the Youth Symphony Orchestra of Magdeburg.

Voluntary work 
In addition to his full-time work, Schneyer volunteered at his work places and in various associations:

 In 1993 he sang as bass in the Magdeburg Chamber Choir, took over a part of the management in 1998 and ended his membership in 2002.
 1993 to 2000 he was chairman of the board of the state centre "Spiel & Theater" Sachsen-Anhalt e. V..
 1994 to 2009 he assisted Frank Satzky in the Magdeburg Boys' Choir.
 since 1997 (with a break from 2005 to 2008) he is a member of the staff council of the G.-Ph.-Telemann Conservatory, which he has presided over since 2012.
 From 2005 he was a member of the presidium of the State Music Council of Saxony-Anhalt and from 2008 to 2012 its vice president.
 From 2008 to 2017 he was a member and chairman of the German Composers' Association State Representation Saxony-Anhalt.
 since 2008 he has been Chairman of the Board of Trustees of the Hans Stieber Foundation.
 since 2014 he is an employee representative of the Works Committee of the Conservatory G.-Ph.-Telemann.

Educational work

Composer class(es) 
At the beginning of his employment at the G.-Ph.-Telemann Conservatory, his growing composer class cooperated with that of his colleague Dieter Nathow to enable joint concerts by the students. After his retirement in 2002 Bernhard Schneyer took over the sole direction of the composer class in Magdeburg. Increasing participation of his students in courses of the composer class Halle-Dresden, which was led by Schneyer's fellow students, led to an ideal fusion of both classes. After the dissolution of the Halle-Dresden Composers' Class in 2007, the Saxony-Anhalt Composers' Class was formed and Schneyer took over as its director from 2008 to 2012. Since 2012 he has been deputy chairman.

Youth Symphony Orchestra Magdeburg 
In 2008 he took over the direction of the Magdeburg Youth Symphony Orchestra. In the following years, Magdeburg's international concert tours and joint projects developed through town twinning. Thus the JSO was in Le Havre in 2014 and 2017 and in Radom in 2016. Return visits of the music schools have already taken place and are planned for the future. Financially this is only possible through benefit concerts, which the two Rotary Clubs of Magdeburg organize once a year for the orchestra.

Discography 
 2009 "Sonnengesänge", including "Sonne (for soprano, flutes and piano)"

Compositions

Orchestral work

Orchestra 
 Spiegel for chamber orchestra (1990), premiere: 2005 Magdeburgische Philharmonie, Rainer Roos, publisher: Int. Sternscher Musikverlag Oberhausen
 In the decision for large orchestra (1991), premiere: 1993, Holzminden, University Symphony Orchestra Dresden, Milko Kersten
 Phase limits for string orchestra (2004), premiere: 2004, Wernigerode, Youth Chamber Orchestra, Peter Wegener
 Zwischen-Welt for large orchestra (2008), premiere: 2008, Magdeburg, Mitteldeutsche Kammerphilharmonie, Christian Simonis
 Morgenstern for wind orchestra and tubular bells (2008), premiere: 2008, Magdeburg, Youth Symphony Orchestra Magdeburg, Bernhard Schneyer
 Pluto for large orchestra (2010), premiere: 2010, Dessau, Anhaltische Philharmonie Dessau, Antony Hermus
 Luthroskop for plucked string orchestra (2011), premiere: 2011, Halle/S., String Ensemble Steglitz, Verlag Neue Musik Berlin
 Eiris for orchestra (2013), premiere: 2013, Schönebeck, Mitteldeutsche Kammerphilharmonie, Gerard Oskamp

Piano Concerts 
 Daedalus für Klavier und Orchester (2010), premiere: 2011, Ilsenburg, Kristin Henneberg, Klavier, Jugendsinfonieorchester Magdeburg, Bernhard Schneyer, Verlag Neue Musik Berlin;

Other concertante work 
 Super omnia ligna cedrorum for flute and string orchestra (2008)
 Perdix for flute and orchestra (2013), premiere: 2014, Le Havre (F), Annegret Dorn, flute, Jugendsinfonieorchester Magdeburg.

Opera and other stage works 
 Ferdinand – ein Stier Schauspielmusik (1993), Premiere: 1993, Schönebeck/Elbe, Circus Chaos
 Die Bremer Stadtmusikanten Schauspielmusik (1994), Premiere: 1994, Bernburg, C.-M.-v.-Weber-Theater
 Der tote Tag, Chamber opera (1996)

Vocal pieces 
 Choral songs for mixed chamber choir (1988)
 at night for soprano I + II and alto I + II (1998), text: Inga Lampert
 Evolutionen - a Buddhist Requiem for 3 mixed chamber choirs (2000), part premiere: 2000, Magdeburg, Magdeburg Chamber Choir, Lothar Hennig
 Sonne for soprano, flute and piano (2007), text: Thomas Lawall, premiere: 2007, Marburg, Trio Cantraiano, Verlag Neue Musik Berlin, CD: "Sonnengesänge" Audiomax Dabringhaus and Grimm
 Cold Song for mixed choir, harp and organ (2010), premiere: 2010, Halle/S., chamber choir "cantamus" Halle/S., Dorothea Köhler

Piano and organ works 
 An(n)amnese for piano (1992), premiere: 1992, Dresden, Reiko Füting
 BRAGNERIANA for piano (2006), premiere: 2006, Halle, Maxim Böckelmann
 per aspera ad astra for piano (2007), premiere: 2008, Magdeburg, Maxim Böckelmann, k.o.m. musikverlag Berlin
 Pulsar for organ (2007), premiere: 2008, Halle, Wolfgang Stockmeier
 Autumn. colours for 2 pianos (2011), premiere: 2012, Magdeburg, Leon Luge and Felix Wuttig 
 Blue Moon for organ (2012), premiere: 2012, Magdeburg, Matthias Mück

Chamber music

Strings 
 String quartet I (1989), premiere: 2004, Halle, Philharmonic String Quartet Magdeburg
 12 pieces for double bass alone, in twos, in threes (1991)
 String Quartet II (1997), premiere: 1998, Magdeburg, Philharmonic String Quartet Magdeburg
 Herbststück for 4 violins (1998), premiere: 1998, Magdeburg, violin quartet of the conservatory, cond. Helge Scholz
 Suite gothique for 2 violins and violoncello (2007), premiere: 2008, Conservatory Magdeburg, V: Int. Sternscher Musikverlag Oberhausen

Winds 
 10 pieces for wind quintet (1990)
 Zwischen-Zeit for wind quintet (2008), premiere: 2012, Mitteldeutsche Kammerphilharmonie, V: k.o.m. musikverlag Berlin

Duo and Trio 
 Composition I for 3 trumpets and piano (1999)
 Play I for flute, violoncello and piano (2001), premiere: 2002, Magdeburg, Andrea Wüstenberg (fl.), Stephan Schulz (Vc), Christiane Biewald (clav.)
 Play II for flute, violoncello and piano (2003), premiere: 2003, Dresden, Karoline Schulz, Matthias Lorenz, Uwe Krause
 3 pieces for violin (beginners) and piano (Möwe im Wind, Am Meer, Wetter-Spiel; 2004), Premiere: 2004, Magdeburg, Ina and Maxim Böckelmann,  (3rd piece): 2018, Magdeburg, Ina and Maxim Böckelmann
 Play III for flute, double bass and piano (2005), premiere: 2004, Magdeburg, Sinfonietta Dresden
 Small Anagram for violin and piano (2006), premiere: 2007, Magdeburg, Ina and Maxim Böckelmann
 Retrospectives for 2 trumpets and organ (2007)

Other chamber music works 
 Attempt at an articulation for flute, clarinet, bassoon and piano (1989), premiere: 2005, Magdeburg, members of the Magdeburg Philharmonic Orchestra;
 for five for flute, clarinet, viola, double bass and piano (1991), premiere: 1991, Dresden, student ensemble 
 plucked plucked, shaken Measure for plucked orchestra (1998)
 Composition for recorder(s) and string quartet (2001), premiere: 2007, Magdeburg, Rüdiger Herrmann (bfl.) Arvos-Quartett;
 Vom Himmel hoch... for 2 violins and piano 4 hands (2003)
 tablet tablage for flute, violin, double bass and piano (2004), premiere: 2004, Magdeburg, Sinfonietta Dresden

Editing 
 An der Saale hellem Strande (folk song arrangement) for mixed chamber choir (1996)
 Serenade in C (Tchaikovsky) (arrangement for large orchestra) (2010), premiere: 2010, Wernigerode, Youth Symphony Orchestra Magdeburg, Bernhard Schneyer;
 Luthroskop for plucked string orchestra (2011), premiere: 2011, Halle/S., Saiten-Ensemble Steglitz, V: Verlag Neue Musik Berlin;
 From heaven for string orchestra (2012)

References

External links 
 
 Bernhard Schneyer's homepage
 Komponistenklasse Sachsen-Anhalt's website
 Website of the Konservatorium G.-Ph.-Telemann Magdeburg

1968 births
Living people
People from Wernigerode
German conductors (music)
German composers
German music educators